Eric Victor Rodwell (born May 1, 1957) is an American professional bridge player. He has won the Bermuda Bowl representing the United States five times and is one of ten players who have won the triple crown of bridge: the Bermuda Bowl, the World Open Pairs and the World Team Olympiad.

Personal life
Rodwell was born in San Francisco, California and his family moved to West Lafayette, Indiana in 1965 where his father was a professor of biochemistry at Purdue University. He started playing bridge at the age of eleven by reading books and playing with his parents. Rodwell graduated from West Lafayette High School in 1974 and attended Purdue, graduating with a master's degree in finance in 1981.  Rodwell is currently a full-time bridge professional and lives in Clearwater Beach, Florida with his wife Donna; each has two children from previous marriages, his being twins Jeffrey and Sara (b. 1984).

Bridge career
For decades Rodwell has been in a regular partnership with Jeff Meckstroth, and "Meckwell", for their surnames, is one of the most successful pairs of all time. They are well known for playing an aggressive and very detailed system called RM Precision (for Rodwell-Meckstroth), of which Rodwell is the principal theorist and author. Although he first learned basic Precision at the age of 14, he didn't get serious about developing his own version until 1982 after he and Meckstroth were already winning. Most of RM Precision was developed subsequently in the early '80s with adaptations following more slowly thereafter. As a bidding theorist, Rodwell has created several conventions and methods including the support double, conventional transfers in many situations, the pass-double inversion and the serious three notrump.  Although the Unusual Major Jumps Over One Diamond Opening convention (UMJOODO) is often credited to him, he denies inventing it.

Although he has not actively pursued masterpoints as a goal, he is one of the all-time top masterpoint holders in the American Contract Bridge League, and won the Barry Crane Trophy for winning the most masterpoints in a year in 2004.  Possibly his most remarkable achievement was at the ACBL's 2008 fall championships, where with four major events available to be contested, he won three (Open Board-A-Match Teams, Blue Ribbon Pairs, Reisinger Teams) and finished second in the fourth (Life Master Open Pairs).  The three wins were with Jeff Meckstroth, and the second place with John Diamond.

As of 2022, Rodwell is inactive in face to face bridge.  North American Bridge Championships require all participants to be vaccinated against COVID19, and Rodwell has refused to be vaccinated.

Bridge accomplishments

Awards
 ACBL Player of the Year 2008
 Barry Crane Top 500 2004
 Mott-Smith Trophy 1980
 Fishbein Trophy 1991, 1999, 2004, 2007
 Herman Trophy 1982, 1985, 1998
 Goren Trophy 2008

Wins
 Bermuda Bowl (5) 1981, 1995, 2000, 2003, 2009
 World Open Team Olympiad (1) 1988
 World Open Pairs (1) 1986
 North American Bridge Championships (57)
 Vanderbilt (7) 1980, 1982, 1985, 2000, 2003, 2014, 2017
 Spingold (12) 1984, 1988, 1991, 1993, 1994, 1995, 1996, 1998, 1999, 2004, 2006, 2007
 Reisinger (9) 1979, 1985, 1993, 1994, 1995, 2004, 2005, 2008, 2009
 Grand National Teams (12) 1990, 1999, 2000, 2002, 2004, 2007, 2008, 2011, 2012, 2013, 2014, 2015
 Open Board-a-Match Teams (1) 2008
 Men's Board-a-Match Teams (1) 1984
 Jacoby Open Swiss Teams (5) 1994, 2002, 2006, 2008, 2009
 North American Men's Swiss Teams (1) 1989
 Blue Ribbon Pairs (3) 1982, 1985, 2008
 Life Master Pairs (3) 1980, 1986, 1991
 Life Master Men's Pairs (1) 1979
 Open Pairs (1) 1979
 Open Pairs II (1) 1999
 United States Bridge Championships (13)
  Open Team Trials (13) 1980, 1988, 1991, 1992, 1998, 2001, 2002, 2004, 2007, 2008, 2012, 2014, 2017
 European Open Bridge Championships (1)
 Open Pairs (1) 2003
 Other notable wins:
 Cavendish Invitational Teams (3) 2000, 2003, 2008
 Staten Bank World Top Invitational Pairs (1) 1988
 Macallan Invitational Pairs (2) 1995, 1996
 Cavendish Invitational Pairs (2) 2000, 2008

Runners-up
 Bermuda Bowl (2) 1997, 2005
 World Open Team Olympiad (1) 1992
 North American Bridge Championships (23)
 Vanderbilt (5) 1991, 1996, 2002, 2018, 2019
 Spingold (5) 1979, 1985, 1990, 2011, 2012
 Reisinger (1) 1980
 Grand National Teams (3) 1994, 2003, 2005
 Open Board-a-Match Teams (2) 1998, 1999
 Jacoby Open Swiss Teams (1) 2005
 Master Mixed Teams (1) 1983
 Blue Ribbon Pairs (1) 1998
 Life Master Pairs (1) 1983
 Life Master Open Pairs (2) 1992, 2008
 Life Master Men's Pairs (1) 1985
 Roth Open Swiss Teams (2) 2015, 2018
 United States Bridge Championships (6)
  Open Team Trials (6) 1982, 1984, 1985, 1993, 1997, 2009
 Other notable 2nd places:
 Cavendish Invitational Teams (1) 2009
 Cap Volmac World Top Invitational Pairs (1) 1994
 Sunday Times–Macallan Invitational Pairs (1) 1993
 Cavendish Invitational Pairs (3) 1984, 2006, 2009

Publications
  
 Revised edition, 1989, . 
 French language edition, Le plaisir du bridge, Saint-Laurent, Québec: Éditions du Trécarré, 1988, transl. Bernard Bourget (374 pp.)
 
 Plaisir du bridge: cahier d'exercices, Trécarré, 1989,  (135 pp.) – translation of The Joy of Bridge companion (exercises)

References

External links
 
 
 Eric Rodwell at Bridge Winners
 Interview by Bridgematters (2001)
  by Mark Horton (July 2011)
 Biographical information at the United States Bridge Federation
  

1957 births
American contract bridge players
Bermuda Bowl players
Contract bridge writers
Krannert School of Management alumni
People from West Lafayette, Indiana
People from San Francisco
Living people